Jesús Burgos Pinto (born 3 August 1953) is a Mexican politician from the Institutional Revolutionary Party. From 2000 to 2003 he served as Deputy of the LVIII Legislature of the Mexican Congress representing Sinaloa.

References

1953 births
Living people
People from Guasave
Politicians from Sinaloa
Institutional Revolutionary Party politicians
21st-century Mexican politicians
Deputies of the LVIII Legislature of Mexico
Members of the Chamber of Deputies (Mexico) for Sinaloa